The Miliolida are an order of foraminifera with calcareous, porcelacous tests that are imperforate and commonly have a pseudochitinous lining.  Tests are composed of randomly oriented calcite needles that have a high proportion of magnesium along with organic material. Tests lack pores and generally have multiple chambers.

Miliolids, which range from the Carboniferous to recent, are benthic Foraminifera abundant in shallow waters such as in estuaries and along coastlines, though they also include deepwater oceanic forms.

The order Miliolida, sometimes referred to as a suborder, the Miliolina, is divided on the basis of differences in test morphology into five recognized superfamilies.

References

External links 
 

Tubothalamea
Foraminifera orders
Carboniferous first appearances